Salvador Antonio Valdés Mesa (born 13 June 1945) is a Cuban politician and former trade union leader. He is the First Vice President of Cuba since April 2018 and is a member of the Political Bureau of the Communist Party of Cuba. He was elected to succeed Miguel Díaz-Canel as First Vice President of Cuba on 19 April 2018.

Biography
Salvador Valdés was part of the Association of Young Rebels since 1961, after the triumph of the Cuban Revolution. He was a leader of the Workers' Central Union of Cuba and the Communist Party of Cuba. He served as Minister of Labor and Social Security between 1995 and 1999, when he was elected first secretary of the PCC in the province of Camagüey. He has been a deputy of the National Assembly of People's Power since 1993, he is a member of the Political Council of the Central Committee of the Communist Party of Cuba and a member of the Council of State (first for Santa Cruz del Sur, then Güines starting in the 9th legislature) where he holds one of the five Vice Presidencies.

References

External links

Biography by CIDOB (in Spanish)

1945 births
Cuban people of African descent
Living people
Cuban politicians
Cuban communists
Communist Party of Cuba politicians
Vice presidents of Cuba